The discography of American traditional pop and jazz singer Tony Bennett consists of 61 studio albums, 11 live albums, 
33 compilation albums, three video albums, one extended play and 83 singles.

Almost all of Bennett's albums have been released by Columbia Records. The biggest selling of his albums in the US have been I Left My Heart in San Francisco, MTV Unplugged: Tony Bennett, Duets: An American Classic and Duets II, all of which were certified platinum by the RIAA for shipping one million copies. Nine other albums of his have gone gold in the US, including several compilations. Bennett has also charted over 30 singles during his career, with his biggest hits all occurring during the early 1950s. Bennett's single "Body and Soul" hit number 87 on the US Billboard Hot 100 in 2011, his first single to hit the chart in over three decades.

Albums

Studio albums

Christmas Albums

Collaborative albums

Live albums

Compilation albums

Video albums

Extended plays

Singles
The US chart positions before "Young and Warm and Wonderful" are pre-Billboard Hot 100.

Other charted songs

Other appearances

Music videos

Notes

A  Tony Bennett's Greatest Hits, Vol. III was released under the title Tony's Greatest Hits in the United Kingdom.
B  "The Moment of Truth" did not enter the Billboard Hot 100, but peaked at number 27 on the Bubbling Under Hot 100 Singles chart, which acts as an extension to the Hot 100.
C  "Song from the Oscar" did not enter the Billboard Hot 100, but peaked at number 4 on the Bubbling Under Hot 100 Singles chart, which acts as an extension to the Hot 100.
D  "A Time for Love" did not enter the Billboard Hot 100, but peaked at number 19 on the Bubbling Under Hot 100 Singles chart, which acts as an extension to the Hot 100.
E  "A Fool of Fools" did not enter the Billboard Hot 100, but peaked at number 19 on the Bubbling Under Hot 100 Singles chart, which acts as an extension to the Hot 100.
F  "Yesterday I Heard the Rain" did not enter the Billboard Hot 100, but peaked at number 30 on the Bubbling Under Hot 100 Singles chart, which acts as an extension to the Hot 100.
G  "(Where Do I Begin) Love Story" did not enter the Billboard Hot 100, but peaked at number 14 on the Bubbling Under Hot 100 Singles chart, which acts as an extension to the Hot 100.
H  "Living Together, Growing Together" did not enter the Billboard Hot 100, but peaked at number 11 on the Bubbling Under Hot 100 Singles chart, which acts as an extension to the Hot 100.
I  "The Lady Is a Tramp" did not enter the Billboard Hot 100, but peaked at number 21 on the Bubbling Under Hot 100 Singles chart, which acts as an extension to the Hot 100.

References
General

Specific

External links
 Official website
 
 
 

Vocal jazz discographies
Pop music discographies
Discographies of American artists